Eduard Anatoliyovych Prutnik (born 15 January 1973) is a Ukrainian businessman and philanthropist. Chairman of the board of directors of the United World International Foundation.

Biography
Eduard Prutnik was born on 15 January 1973 in the town of Selydove in the Donetsk region. He is married to Oksana Prutnik, and has two sons (Kyrylo and Danylo) and a daughter (Maria). He attended Donetsk National University and graduated as Candidate of Sciences in economics. His business interests include banking, media and mining companies. In 2008, his net worth was estimated at $360 million.

Business activities
Uvercon Invested Limited – the company has changed and added some major business activities during past few years. The range of work is very wide and covers from agricultural activity, mining works, ship building to finance. Eduard Prutnik is the chairman of the company.

Namakwa Diamonds –  vertically integrated diamond mining company, has a diversified portfolio of diamond projects, which include separate diamond facilities in four African Countries – RSA, Democratic Republic of Congo, Namibia and Angola.

Uvercon Zimbabwe Gold Mining – gold mining company that was created in 2011. It specializes in exploration, development and operation of precious and non-ferrous metals. Prutnik is the investor and the shareholder.

Mobilauch – is a digital agency that specializes in creative design and development. It provides creative solutions that are custom tailored to all stages of digital development. The company is based in Dunedin, New Zealand and Los Angeles, California. Prutnik is an investor and a shareholder.

SOZO APP Inc - American start up company, based on mobile application and one of a kind technology.

GCRF – one of the Structured Finance and investment advisory firms, with particular focus on: Finance and Investment, Maritime, Energy, Natural Resources, Transport, and Real Estate. The group includes offices located in Los Angeles, Dubai and Moscow. World known for transactions in Maritime Finance, Energy projects development, and emerging company representation in renewable energy sectors worldwide. Prutnik is an investor and partner.

Odyssey Company - business is based on research, analysis and acquisition of innovative patents from all over the world.

MEDOK Group companies – UAE based number of companies that specialize in general trade, business consulting and diamond trade. Eduard is founder and owner.

Ukrainian Milk Company 

Housing Union of Ukraine – company, specializing in professional management and maintenance of housing facilities, uses the experience of high-end service tools in Housing and Community Amenities;

Megakhim company group – development, installment and sale of high-end technology and products of oil industry, in particular – Megalight-Nano - fluidized nanocomposition for catalytic controlling (patent in more than 120 countries in the world) used for optimizing and improving the quality of oil (benzene, kerosene, and diesel).

Public activities
Prutnik is chairman of the board of the United World International Foundation, which he created in April 2008. The foundation aims to raise Ukrainians' awareness of their national identity (and its importance to their community and the world) and secure their rights and opportunities in the global society.

United World International Fund – international humanitarian fund created by Eduard Prutnik. It is politically independent structure. The Fund is eager to cooperate with different political parties and institutions, which work as in Ukraine so in the other entire world and share the goals and the tasks of the Fund. While Fund participated in building quality relations of Ukraine and Russian Federation it resulted in successful outcome until 2012.

In March 2006, Eduard Prutnik was elected a People’s Deputy of Ukraine from the Party of Regions. At the time of his election, Prutnik was chairman of the board of the non-governmental organization Sotsium, a member of the Party of Regions, head of the Subcommittee for Legal Support of Economic, Anthropogenic and Environmental Safety of the Committee for National Security and Defence of Ukraine (July–October 2006) and a member of the Party of Regions in the Ukrainian Parliament (May–October 2006).

Prutnik was re-elected to the Ukrainian Parliament from the Party of Regions at the single-seat national constituency as 55th in the list of candidates. At that time, Prutnik was chairman of the State Committee for Television and Radio Broadcasting of Ukraine, a member of the Party of Regions, a member of the Committee on Freedom of Speech and Information of the Verkhovna Rada of Ukraine (26 December 2007 – 13 April 2010) and a member of the Verkhovna Rada Committee on Fuel and Energy Complex, Nuclear Policy and Nuclear Safety (since 23 February 2012). He was elected head of the Verkhovna Rada Interim Committee of Inquiry for the investigation of interference by government and local authorities and their officials to the media and reports on freedom-of-speech violations in the media (18 December 2009 – 30 March 2010).
Prutnik is a member of the Groups for Inter-Parliamentary Liaison with the United States and France.

During his term as the People’s Deputy of the sixth session of the Verkhovna Rada, Prutnik submitted the top number of inquiries among all People’s Deputies. His membership in the Party of Regions was awarded by a decision of the political council of Constituency 217 of the Chernihiv Region. To ensure consideration of voter issues, Prutnik has opened four community liaison offices.

External links
Eduard Prutnik's official website
Website of “United World” International Foundation
Eduard Prutnik's People’s Deputy page on the website of the Verkhovna Rada of Ukraine

References

1973 births
Living people
People from Donetsk Oblast
Party of Regions politicians
Fifth convocation members of the Verkhovna Rada
Sixth convocation members of the Verkhovna Rada
Ukrainian philanthropists
Donetsk National University alumni
Pryazovskyi State Technical University alumni
Recipients of the Honorary Diploma of the Cabinet of Ministers of Ukraine